Following is a list of parks, forests and nature preserves in the metropolitan area of Klamath Falls, Oregon:

State Parks 
 Collier Memorial State Park, features a campground and outdoor museum of historic logging equipment dating to the 1880s along the shores of the Williamson River.
 Fort Rock Cave, has served as a vital part of the Native American lifestyle.  
 Jackson F. Kimball State Recreation Site, a pristine site located at the headwaters of the Wood River. 
 OC&E Woods Line State Trail, Oregon's longest linear park, a 100-mile rail trail.

City Parks system 

 Moore Park and Moore Park Marinas, 458 acres on the south shore of Upper Klamath Lake.
 Kit Carson Park, 9.1 acres adjacent to Crater Lake Parkway, picnic, playground, baseball.
 Conger Heights Park, 10.6 acres leased to the Klamath Falls City School District.
 Ella Redkey pool, 2.4 acres, geothermically heated.
 Klamath Falls Veterans Memorial Park, 3.30 acres, downtown Klamath Falls.
 Mills-Kiwanis Park, 2.40 acres, basketball court, swings, scrimmage soccer field.
 Krause Park, 2.8 acre neighborhood park.
 Fairview Park, 3.10 acres primarily open space and a children's playground.
 Lynnewood Hills Open Area, 104 acres above Moore Park
 Conger Heights Open Area, 32.96 acres on east side of Link River in downtown Klamath Falls.
 Kiger Stadium, 7.1 acres, 5,000 seat wood stadium
 Putnam Landing Park, 2.56 acres on south shore of Upper Klamath and Link River.
 Southside Park, 13.4 acres in southern Klamath Falls
 Warford Park, 8.6 acres in western Klamath Falls, baseball, playground, picnic, trail
 Fairview Park, 3.1 acres with picnic, playground, athletic field
 Stukel Park, .7 acres with basketball, tennis court, playground
 Maple Park, 1 acre, south trailhead for Link River Canyon trail and home of Klamth Art Association.
 Henderson Park, .6 acre with athletic field and swings

Wiard Memorial Park and Recreation District 

The Wiard Memorial Park and Recreation District in Klamath Falls is a taxing district that operates six parks and recreational facilities within the Klamath Falls metropolitan area.

 Wiard Park, the largest park in the Wiard Park District with just over 5 acres. Although built with a wading pool, it closed permanently on account of the water not circulating from the pool.
 Crest Park, open space of little over 3 acres. Sold to Wiard Park District in 1969 for $900.
 Keller Park, primarily open space with a playground, basketball and volleyball courts and a covered picnic area.
 Etna Park, named for the street it is located on, features primarily open space with a playground and picnic area since 1932.
 Alva Park, a small park named for the street it is located on, features half a basketball court, playground and picnic area, donated in 1949.
 Klein Park, located in the Casitas subdivision, features a playground and a basketball and volleyball courts.

See also 
 List of Oregon state parks
 Oregon State Parks and Recreation Department

References 

Klamath Falls, Oregon
Klamath Falls
parks in Klamath Falls